The Legend of Hell House is a 1973 gothic supernatural horror film directed by John Hough, and starring Pamela Franklin, Roddy McDowall, Clive Revill, and Gayle Hunnicutt. It follows a group of researchers who spend a week in the former home of a sadist and murderer, where previous paranormal investigators were inexplicably killed. Its screenplay was written by American author Richard Matheson, based upon his 1971 novel Hell House.

Plot
Physicist Dr. Lionel Barrett is enlisted by eccentric millionaire Rudolph Deutsch to undertake an investigation on the afterlife at Belasco House, the "Mount Everest of haunted houses." The house was originally owned by Emeric Belasco, an imposing, perverted millionaire and supposed murderer, who disappeared soon after a massacre occurred at the home. The house is believed to be haunted by the victims of Belasco's twisted and sadistic desires.

Accompanying Barrett are his wife, Ann, as well as two mediums: mental medium and spiritualist minister Florence Tanner and physical medium Benjamin Franklin "Ben" Fischer, who is the only survivor of an investigation conducted 20 years before. The group arrive to begin their investigation a week before Christmas Eve, and the rationalist Barrett is rudely skeptical of Florence's belief in "surviving personalities", spirits which haunt the physical world, and he asserts that there is nothing but unfocused electromagnetic energy in the house. Barrett brings a machine he has developed, which he believes will rid the house of this energy. Though not a physical medium, Florence begins to manifest physical phenomena inside the house. When, after a quarrel with Tanner, Barrett is attacked by invisible forces, he suspects that Florence may be using the house's energy against him. Meanwhile, Fischer remains aloof, with his mind closed to the house's influence, and is only there to collect the generous paycheck.

Ann is subjected to erotic visions late at night, which seem linked to her lackluster sex life. She goes downstairs and, in an apparent trance, disrobes and demands sex from Fischer. He strikes her, snapping her out of the trance, and she returns to herself, horrified and ashamed. A second incident occurs a day or so later after she has become drunk. Her husband arrives a moment later to witness her advances to Fischer. He is resentful, and spurns Fischer's warnings that the house is affecting Ann. Stricken by the accusation, Fischer drops his psychic shields, but he is immediately attacked.

Florence is convinced that one of the "surviving personalities" in the home is Daniel, Belasco's tormented son, and she is determined to prove it at all costs. She finds a human skeleton chained behind a wall. Believing it to be Daniel, Florence and Fischer bury the body outside and Florence performs a funeral. Nevertheless, Daniel's "personality" continues to haunt Florence; she is scratched violently by a possessed cat. Barrett suspects that Florence is mutilating herself. In an attempt to put Daniel to rest, Florence gives herself to the entity sexually, but the entity brutalizes her and possesses her body.

Barrett's machine is assembled. Possessed by the malevolent spirit, Florence attempts to destroy it, thinking that it will harm the spirits in the house, but she is prevented from doing serious damage. She enters the chapel, "the unholy heart" of the house, in an attempt to warn the spirits, but she is crushed by a falling crucifix. As she dies, she leaves a symbol written in her own blood. Barrett activates his machine, which seems to be effective. Fischer wanders the house afterwards, attempting to sense psychic energy; in astonishment, he declares the place "completely clear!" But violent psychic activity soon resumes, and Barrett is killed.

Fischer decides to confront the house, and Ann accompanies him despite her misgivings. Deciphering Florence's dying clue, Fischer deduces that Belasco is the sole entity haunting the house, masquerading as many. He taunts Belasco, declaring him a "son of a whore", and that he was no "roaring giant", but instead more likely a "funny little dried-up bastard" who fooled everyone about his alleged height. Even as objects begin to hurl themselves at Fischer, he continues to defy the entity, and insults Belasco's physical stature. At that, all becomes still. Fischer then concentrates, and a stained-glass partition in the chapel shatters, revealing a hidden door.

Fischer and Ann discover a lead-lined room, containing Belasco's preserved body seated in a chair. Pulling out a pocket knife, Fischer rips open Belasco's trouser leg, discovering his final secret: a pair of prosthetic legs. Fischer realises that Belasco had had his own stunted legs amputated, and that he had used the prosthetics with which they were replaced in a grotesque attempt to appear imposing. Belasco also had the specially built room lined with lead, presaging the discovery of the electromagnetic nature of life after death.

With the room now open, Fischer activates Barrett's machine a second time, and he and Ann leave the house, hoping that Barrett and Florence will guide Belasco to the afterlife without fear.

Cast
Pamela Franklin as Florence Tanner
Roddy McDowall as Benjamin Franklin Fischer
Clive Revill as Dr. Lionel Barrett
Gayle Hunnicutt an Ann Barrett
Roland Culver as Rudolph Deutsch
Peter Bowles as Hanley
Michael Gough as Emeric Belasco (uncredited)

Production

Development
Production began on 23 October 1972. The Legend of Hell House is one of only two productions of James H. Nicholson after his departure from American International Pictures — a company he had run, along with Samuel Z. Arkoff, since 1954. Nicholson died of a brain tumour in 10 December 1972, before the film's release on 15 June 1973. Nicholson's company, Academy Pictures Corporation, also released Dirty Mary, Crazy Larry through Twentieth Century Fox on 17 May 1974.

Matheson's screenplay drastically reduced some of the more extreme elements of the novel, particularly its graphic sexuality and BDSM. It also changed the location of the events to England, whereas the novel took place at an estate in rural Maine in the United States.

Filming
The external shots of the house were filmed at Wykehurst Park, West Sussex. Mr. Deutsch's mansion in the opening sequence is Blenheim Palace in Woodstock, Oxfordshire. The interior shot of the long room is the palace's library.

The role of Belasco was played by an uncredited Michael Gough. His part consisted of a couple of recorded lines and an on-camera appearance as an embalmed corpse seated upright in a chair.

The plot of both this film and the book on which it is based, both written by Richard Matheson, have several details in common with Shirley Jackson’s 1959 novel The Haunting of Hill House (and subsequent 1963 movie adaptation The Haunting) in which a party of four (some psychic, some skeptical, some British, some Americans) stay in an extremely haunted Gothic mansion house with a terrible history, for the purposes of scientific study, and all are plagued by unseen terrors. It is to both of the films’ credit that they only partially resemble each other.

Soundtrack
The film features a score with an electronic music bassline (with occasional woodwind and brass stabs). The score and electronic sound effects were created by Delia Derbyshire and Brian Hodgson, recorded at Hodgson's Electrophon studio in London. The soundtrack remains unavailable commercially.

Release

Critical response
Critical response to The Legend of Hell House varied. In 1976, Roger Ebert wrote in his review of Burnt Offerings, another movie about a haunted house, that "The Legend of Hell House brought out the fun in this sort of material very well." In his 2002 Movie & Video Guide, Leonard Maltin gave the film three of four stars and called it "Not the usual ghost story, and certain to curl a few hairs." The Time Out Company called the film disappointing, but it approved of Pamela Franklin's performance. TV Guide stated that "While director John Hough does a fine job with the things-that-go-bump-in-the-night aspects of the material, he fails to breathe any life into Richard Matheson's woefully underdeveloped screenplay."

Home media
The Legend of Hell House was released on DVD by 20th Century Fox Home Entertainment on 4 September 2001. The DVD included the theatrical trailer as a special feature.

On 26 August 2014, the Shout! Factory label Scream Factory released the film on Blu-ray. The release included a 30-minute interview with director John Hough, a commentary track by actress Pamela Franklin, stills gallery, original theatrical trailer, radio ads and reversible cover art featuring the theatrical artwork and customized artwork for the Blu-ray release.

Related works

Matheson's screenplay was published in the 1997 collection Screamplays and again in 2000 as a stand alone text.

In popular culture
 Dialogue from the film has been sampled in popular songs by the bands Anaal Nathrakh and Skinny Puppy, and in Orbital's "I Don't Know You People" from their 1999 album The Middle of Nowhere.
 It inspired Martin Kunert and Eric Manes to create Fear for MTV Networks.
 Marvel Comics adapted the story into its Werewolf by Night comic book series in issues #34-37.
 Director Edgar Wright used the film as inspiration for his faux trailer Don't, featured in the movie Grindhouse.

See also
The Haunting, (1963) an earlier film with a similar premise, based on the 1959 novel, The Haunting of Hill House.
List of ghost films

References

Sources

External links 

1973 films
1973 horror films
1970s Christmas films
1970s fantasy films
British fantasy films
Films based on American horror novels
Films based on works by Richard Matheson
British ghost films
British haunted house films
British supernatural horror films
Films directed by John Hough
Films shot at EMI-Elstree Studios
20th Century Fox films
Films with screenplays by Richard Matheson
Films set in country houses
1970s English-language films
1970s British films